Movilița is a commune located in Vrancea County, Romania. It is composed of five villages: Diocheți-Rediu, Frecăței, Movilița, Trotușanu and Văleni.

References

Communes in Vrancea County
Localities in Western Moldavia